Parapolyacanthia is a genus of longhorn beetles of the subfamily Lamiinae, containing the following species:

 Parapolyacanthia assimilis Breuning, 1955
 Parapolyacanthia trifolium (Fauvel, 1906)

References

Acanthoderini